The  is a subcompact crossover SUV produced by Nissan since 2016. The crossover was initially introduced as a concept car under the same name and was premiered at the 2014 São Paulo International Motor Show. Nissan claimed the concept is inspired by the streets of Brazil. Currently, the Kicks nameplate is used for two similar-looking vehicles, albeit being built on different platforms with different dimensions.

The V platform-based Kicks debuted in São Paulo, Brazil in 2016 with the P15 chassis code. The car was designed collaboratively by Nissan's design headquarters in Atsugi, Japan, Nissan Design America (NDA) in San Diego, California, and Nissan Design America Rio de Janeiro. The Kicks was then gradually rolling out across Latin America, then it entered the United States and Canada in 2018 to replace the Juke as the subcompact crossover offering in both countries.

The B0 platform-based Kicks was introduced in India on 22 January 2019 with the D15 chassis code. The company stated the vehicle is built on the platform to reduce production costs. As the result, it is slightly larger than the V platform-based Kicks, and retained the same wheelbase as the first-generation Dacia Duster and the B0 platform-based Renault Captur.



Global market (P15; 2016) 

Originally unveiled as a concept in 2014, the Nissan Kicks was showcased across Brazil during summer 2016 to promote the Summer Olympics, of which Nissan was a lead sponsor. The crossover went on sale in China in July 2017, replacing the Nissan Livina C-Gear.

The Kicks made the North American debut on 29 November 2017 at the Los Angeles Auto Show and was slated to be on sale in June 2018. Imported from Mexico, it replaced the Nissan Juke and also indirectly replaced the Nissan Versa Note as a subcompact hatchback offering in the region.

The Kicks features a standard touchscreen audio system with Bluetooth for hands-free calling and wireless stereo audio streaming, as well as USB integration and a rearview backup camera display. Up-level models also offer an upgraded infotainment system Apple CarPlay and Android Auto smartphone integration, as well as a Bose premium amplified audio system that features small speakers mounted in the front headrests. North American-market Kicks models also offer SiriusXM Satellite Radio on most models.

Kicks e-Power
On 15 May 2020, the Kicks e-Power was released in Thailand. It features an updated look with reworked front fascia and tail lights. The Kicks e-Power combines a HR12DE 1.2-litre 3-cylinder petrol engine and an EM57 electric motor that drives the front wheels, making it a series hybrid with no plug-in capability. The Kicks e-Power was also revealed in Japan on 24 June 2020 and released on 30 June 2020, as well as in Singapore on 9 July 2020, Indonesia on 2 September 2020, the Philippines on 12 August 2022, and Vietnam on 2 November 2022. Its launch for the Mexican market was announced on 10 September 2021, celebrating Nissan's 60th anniversary in the Mexican market.

2021 facelift 
An updated version of the standard Kicks was revealed in December 2020. The front fascia was made identical to the Kicks e-Power that was launched earlier, with a larger grille and LED headlights. The rear fascia received minor updates, mostly to the bumper. Inside, the 2021 Kicks received upgrades including a center armrest, larger touchscreen, and an electronic parking brake. Apple CarPlay and Android Auto smartphone integration is standard. Trim levels and powertrain are unchanged. The suspension for the 2021 Kicks, which features an independent front strut with rear twin-tube shock absorbers, is also identical to the previous 2020 model. The updated Kicks went on sale in North America in February 2021.

Engines 
The Kicks is equipped with Nissan's HR16DE 1.6 L four-cylinder petrol engine shared with the Versa. Nissan rates this engine to receive an EPA fuel economy rating of  city and  highway. The Chinese and Taiwanese version uses Nissan's HR15DE 1.5 L four-cylinder petrol engine.

Safety 
It has optional rear disc brakes.

On 1 August 2018, Mexican automotive magazine Autología took a Fan Edition version of the Kicks on a moose test. Due to a lack of an electronic stability program (ESP) in this particular trim, the Kicks nearly rolled over while performing the test at 65 km/h. A higher-spec model with ESP was also tested, and it managed to keep all four tires on the ground at the same speed but the driver did not feel the car could manage to return to the road, hence failing the test.

Latin NCAP
The Kicks in its most basic Latin American configuration with 2 airbags received 4 stars for adult occupants and 4 stars for toddlers from Latin NCAP in 2017.

IIHS

2020

2021

Indian market (D15; 2019) 

For the Indian market, a larger car with a similar styling as the original Kicks was introduced on 22 January 2019. It replaced the Nissan Terrano, a restyled Dacia Duster offered since 2013. The D15 Kicks is also offered in Nepal and Bangladesh.

The Indian market Kicks shares platform and parts with Dacia Duster and the B0 platform-based Renault Captur to cut costs, as all of them were manufactured in the same Renault-Nissan plant in Chennai. As the result, the Indian-market Kicks shares very little parts or sheet metal with the global Kicks. 

The D15 Kicks initially was offered with the H4K/HR15DE naturally aspirated petrol engine and the K9K diesel engine, both mated to a 6-speed manual transmission. Both engines are shared with the Renault Captur.

In May 2020, Nissan announced the discontinuation of the K9K diesel engine due to the implementation of Bharat Stage 6 emission standards while offering the Renault-Nissan-Daimler HR13DDT petrol turbo engine, with cylinder coating technology borrowed from Nissan GT-R engine, as a replacement. The engine is also offered with the X-Tronic CVT transmission option for the first time.

As a marketing effort, the Kicks was made an official car for the 2019 ICC Cricket World Cup.

In 2023 Nissan Kicks will be discontinued due to low sales and Bharat Stage 6 Phase 2.

Sales

References

External links 

  (Japan)
  (United States)

Kicks
Cars introduced in 2016
2020s cars
Mini sport utility vehicles
Crossover sport utility vehicles
Front-wheel-drive vehicles
Hybrid sport utility vehicles
Latin NCAP small family cars
Partial zero-emissions vehicles
Vehicles with CVT transmission
Hybrid electric cars
Cars of Brazil